Chalanam is a 1975 Indian Malayalam film,  directed by  N. R. Pillai and produced by Ponkunnam Varkey. The film stars KPAC Lalitha, Lakshmi, Mohan Sharma and Radhika in the lead roles. The film has musical score by G. Devarajan.

Lakshmi won the Filmfare Award for Best Malayalam Actress for this movie.

Cast

KPAC Lalitha
Lakshmi
Mohan Sharma
Radhika
Alummoodan
Janardanan
Kuthiravattam Pappu
P. K. Abraham
Rani Chandra
Sudheer
Veeran

Soundtrack
The music was composed by G. Devarajan and the lyrics were written by Vayalar.

References

External links
 

1975 films
1970s Malayalam-language films